André Brantjes (born 29 November 1958) is a Dutch former darts player who played in British Darts Organisation (BDO) events till 2006.

Career

Brantjes reached the final of the 2003 German Open, losing to Ted Hankey. He then won the unranked Spring Cup, beating Vincent van der Voort in the semi-finals and then defeating Erik Clarys in the final. After reaching the quarter-finals of the 2004 Finnish Open, Brantjes retained the Spring Cup title, beating Mario Robbe and Dick van Dijk before defeating Niels de Ruiter in the final. Brantjes played in the 2004 International Darts League, losing his opening group game to Gary Anderson, he defeated Robbe before beating Martin Adams to qualify for the second group stage. Brantjes then lost his first two group games against Tony David and Hankey, eventually winning his final group game against Jarkko Komula.

He achieved some fame during the 2005 World Championship, which was his debut at the event. He beat compatriot Co Stompé 3–2 in the first round, making a 170 checkout in only his second leg of the match, and then upset the previous year's runner-up and world number one, Mervyn King, again by 3–2. However, he was then soundly defeated by Simon Whitlock in the quarter-finals, 5–1. Brantjes reached the second round of the 2005 International Darts League, winning his opening group games against van der Voort and Davy Richardson to qualify before losing to John Walton who won the group. Brantjes eventually lost in the second round to Adams.

Brantjes has not played in a tournament since the 2006 World Masters where he lost in the very first round to Ireland's James Keogh.

World Championship results

BDO

 2005: Quarter-finals (lost to Simon Whitlock 1–5)

References

External links
Website (archived)
Player profile on Darts Database

1958 births
Living people
Dutch darts players
Sportspeople from Rotterdam
British Darts Organisation players